"This Crazy Heart of Mine" is a song recorded by Canadian country music artist Charlie Major. It was released in 1996 as the fifth single from his second studio album, Lucky Man. It peaked at number 8 on the RPM Country Tracks chart in February 1997.

Chart performance

Year-end charts

References

1995 songs
1996 singles
Charlie Major songs
Arista Nashville singles
Songs written by Charlie Major